Dar Derafsh-e Seyyed Karim (also Romanized as Dār Derafsh-e Seyyed Karīm) is a village in Baladarband Rural District, in the Central District of Kermanshah County, Kermanshah Province, Iran. At the 2006 census, its population was 63, in 11 families.

References 

Populated places in Kermanshah County